New England is an unincorporated community in Rome Township, Athens County, Ohio, United States.

History
New England was laid out in 1853 when the railroad was built into the area. A post office called New England was established in 1856, and remained in operation until 1907.

References

Populated places in Athens County, Ohio
1853 establishments in Ohio
Populated places established in 1853